The men's heavyweight event was part of the boxing programme at the 1984 Summer Olympics. The weight class allowed boxers of up to 91 kilograms to compete. The competition was held from 31 July to 11 August 1984. 19 boxers from 19 nations competed.

Medalists

Results
The following boxers took part in the event:

First round
 Håkan Brock (SWE) def. Magne Havnå (NOR), RSC-2
 Alex Stewart (JAM) def. Virgilio Frias (DOM), KO-2
 Kaliq Singh (IND) def. Nassam Ajjoub  (SYR), 5:0
 Angelo Musone (ITA) def. James Omondi (KEN), 5:0

Second round
 Georgios Stefanopoulos (GRE) def. Douglas Young (GBR), KO-2
 Arnold Vanderlyde (HOL) def. Egerton Forster (SLE), 4:1
 Willie DeWit (CAN) def. Mohamed Bouchiche (ALG), 5:0
 Dodovic Owiny (UGA) def. Michael Kenny (NZL), RSC-2
 Henry Tillman (USA) def. Kaliq Singh (IND), RSC-1
 Tevita Taufo'ou (TNG) def. Loi Faateete (SAM), 4:1
 Håkan Brock (SWE) def. Alex Stewart (JAM), 5:0

Quarterfinals
 Arnold Vanderlyde (HOL) def. Georgios Stefanopoulos (GRE), 5:0
 Willie DeWit (CAN) def. Dodovic Owiny (UGA), KO-1
 Henry Tillman (USA) def. Tevita Taufo'ou (TNG), RSC-2
 Angelo Musone (ITA) def. Håkan Brock (SWE), 5:0

Semifinals
 Willie DeWit (CAN) def. Arnold Vanderlyde (HOL), 3:2
 Henry Tillman (USA) def. Angelo Musone (ITA), 5:0

Final
 Henry Tillman (USA) def. Willie DeWit (CAN), 5:0

References

Heavyweight